Samuel Keith Williams (born March 7, 1959) is an American former professional basketball player in the National Basketball Association (NBA). He played four seasons in the NBA from 1981 through 1985 with the Golden State Warriors and the Philadelphia 76ers. Williams played college basketball for the Arizona State Sun Devils, where he was an All-Pac-10 first team selection in 1981. He was drafted in the 1981 NBA Draft in the second round with the 33rd overall pick by the Golden State Warriors.  Williams also played in the Continental Basketball Association in 1991-92 for the Bakersfield Jammers.

References

External links

1959 births
Living people
American expatriate basketball people in France
American expatriate basketball people in Italy
American expatriate basketball people in Turkey
American men's basketball players
Arizona State Sun Devils men's basketball players
Bakersfield Jammers players
Basket Napoli players
Basketball players from Los Angeles
BCM Gravelines players
Fenerbahçe men's basketball players
Golden State Warriors draft picks
Golden State Warriors players
Pasadena City Lancers men's basketball players
Philadelphia 76ers players
Power forwards (basketball)
Virtus Bologna players